The Rochester, Syracuse and Eastern Railroad, an interurban rail, began operations in 1906 and linked Rochester, New York, with the nearby towns of Newark, Egypt, Fairport and Palmyra. The railroad was owned by the Beebe Syndicate, and was the only one of its properties that was designed and constructed by the management group.

References

Defunct railroads in Syracuse, New York
Defunct New York (state) railroads
Railway companies established in 1906
Railway companies disestablished in 1917
Interurban railways in New York (state)
Transportation in Rochester, New York
1906 establishments in New York (state)